Akhtar Ali G. Kazi (1944 – 14 October 2010) was a Pakistani politician who served as 16th Chief Minister of Sindh from 11 April 1988 to 24 June 1988 and then as 18th Chief Minister of Sindh in his 2nd term from 31 August 1988 to 2 December 1988.

Early life 
Kazi was born in 1944. He started his career in being chief minister of Sindh in 1988.

References

External links 
 
 

1944 births
2010 deaths
Chief Ministers of Sindh